The Shadow Solicitor General is a member of the Official Opposition frontbench.

Responsibilities 
The Shadow Solicitor General shadows the Solicitor General for England and Wales and deputises for the Shadow Attorney General for England and Wales.

List of officeholders 

 Donald Anderson - 1 January 1994 - 1 January 1996

References 

Official Opposition (United Kingdom)